Cardiopelma is a genus of spiders in the family Theraphosidae.

Description 
Cardiopelma mascatum also known as the Orange Flame Rump Tarantula, is a tarantula which females live up to 16 years, while males only up to 6. Their carapace is a copper like orange color, with a black triangle covering the eyes. The opisthosoma is black with a heart shaped copper colored urticating patch in the center, whereas the bottom of the opisthosoma is orange. Their legs are the same color as the carapace, with the exception of the femur which is black.

Habitat 
They have been found in the south eastern mountains and the borders of Oaxaca City, it is home to a tropical savanna climate. It has average temperatures 20ºC, and average yearly rainfall of 850mm. It is home to animals such as the Tlacuaches, Red-Bellied Squirrels, Coatis or Rock Doves.

Behavior 
They are New World terrestrial tarantulas,  as such they do have urticating hairs. They are a bit skittish in nature, and will usually flee to their hide if bothered. They also are able to throw urticating hairs, but these are rare. Bites of this species are extremely rare, though their bites aren't medically significant.

References

Theraphosidae
Monotypic Theraphosidae genera